The World's Best is an American reality talent competition television series. Produced by Mark Burnett and Mike Darnell, it features international performers being evaluated by three judges—Drew Barrymore, RuPaul and Faith Hill, and a panel called the Wall of the World that consists of 50 experts of entertainment. It premiered on CBS on February 3, 2019, following the conclusion of Super Bowl LIII. The series is hosted by James Corden.

Production 
CBS ordered The World's Best in February 2018; CBS SVP of alternative programming Sharon Vuong credited Mark Burnett and Mike Darnell's experience in the reality genre, stating that they "understand how to create compelling competition and build enduring franchises", and that it would be a "unique, original format with global scale".  Darnell felt that The World's Best was "the next new spin on a variety show", and defended comparisons to a competitor, NBC's America's Got Talent (which, in May, would announce an all-star spin-off series, America's Got Talent: The Champions) by emphasizing its "dramatic" scoring system and international focus as differentiating it from other talent competition series.

In August 2019, CBS president of entertainment Kelly Kahl stated that the network had not yet decided whether The World's Best would be renewed for a second season. Kahl explained that the network "enjoyed the show creatively", but that they would "probably tweak the format a little" if renewed. However, on Apr 25, 2021, TVLine.com stated that the show would not be renewed for a second season.

Format 
Each act is judged by three main judges of American origin, as well as the "Wall of the World" — an international panel of 50 experts in various fields of entertainment. Each judge scores a performance on a scale from 0 to 50, while each member of the Wall panel can give a yes or no vote. The average of the judges' scores, and the number of votes given by the Wall, are totaled into a maximum possible score of 100.

Acts who achieved at least 75 points advance to the Battle round, where the acts are paired into duels against each other. In each battle, the judges score the acts in a similar manner to the audition round, but the Wall votes between the two acts instead.

In the Champions round, the twelve acts who advanced from the battles are grouped into four divisions (consisting of solo and group competitions in "Music" and "Variety" categories) with three acts each.  The act with the lowest score from the American judges is automatically given third place, and a finalist is determined between the remaining two with the main judges' score and the Wall's votes, in the same manner as the Battle round. The winning finalists in each category also each receive a $50,000 prize.

In the finale, semi-final performances are conducted between the solo and group champions in the Music and Variety categories. The winners of each advance to the finals to determine the champion, who wins a $1,000,000 grand prize.

Panelists 
The members of the "Wall of the World" include:

Season 1 (2019)

Auditions
  The act received enough points to advance to the next round
  The act did not receive enough points to advance to the next round

Week 1

Week 2

Week 3

Battle Rounds

 The act won the battle and advanced to the next round
 The act lost the battle and did not advance to the next round

Week 4

Week 5

Week 6

Champion Rounds
 The act won the category and advanced to the next round
 The act came in second in the category and did not advance to the next round
 The act finished in third place after receiving the lowest rating from the American judges
 The act decided to withdraw from the competition

Finale

Elimination Table
Emotional Line and Space Cowboy were brought back to the Battle Rounds to fill out The Top 24.

Ratings

Contestants who appeared on other shows 

 Sister Cristina Scuccia won the second season of The Voice of Italy and competed in the 14th Italian version of Dancing with the Stars, where she made it to the semifinals.
 Daneliya Tuleshova represented Kazakhstan at the Junior Eurovision Song Contest 2018 finishing in sixth position. She participated in The Voice Kids Ukraine in 2017 and won, and also, in 2018 she won "BRAVO AWARDS" in Russia. She later went on the fifteenth season of America's Got Talent, where she made it to the finale.
 Dimash Kudaibergen was the 2015 Grand Prix champion of the International Festival of Arts Slavianski Bazaar. He then became runner-up during the fifth season of China's I Am a Singer.
 Enkh Erdene was the second season winner of Mongolia's Got Talent.
 Jordan McKnight competed on the tenth season of America's Got Talent, where she passed through the auditions but did not make the Top 80.
 Krystyna & Princess appeared on the ninth series of Britain's Got Talent, where they passed through the auditions but did not make the Semifinals.
 Matt Johnson made it to the semifinals in series 12 of Britain's Got Talent.
 Space Cowboy competed on multiple seasons of Australia's Got Talent, most recently in 2019.
 TNT Boys won the second season of Philippines' Your Face Sounds Familiar Kids; then appeared on Little Big Shots, Little Big Shots UK, and the Little Big Shots Australia, Little Big Shots (China) in 2018.
 William Close competed on the seventh season of America's Got Talent.  He finished in third place.
 Liliac, like Daneliya, also competed on the fifteenth season of America's Got Talent. After passing the auditions, the band posted a YouTube video that revealed they had to withdraw before the second round after they were asked to sign a contract that would entitle the show to 99% of their profits over a 5-year period.

References

2019 American television series debuts
2019 American television series endings
2010s American variety television series
2010s American reality television series
CBS original programming
Competitions
Talent shows
English-language television shows
Television series by MGM Television
Television series by Warner Horizon Television
Super Bowl lead-out shows